Tippah Dwan (born 30 October 1999) is a professional Australian netball player.

Dwan was signed by the Queensland Firebirds in the Suncorp Super Netball league ahead of the 2019 season, after spending two years in the extended training squad for the team. Born in Toowoomba in South East Queensland, Dwan was raised in several cities; Brisbane, Adelaide, Sydney, Shanghai and Singapore. As an emerging netballer, Dwan captained the Queensland Under 19 team that traveled to the National Championships in Adelaide in 2018. She also was selected to represent Australia in under 17 and 19 age groups. She made appearances for the Firebirds in all the pre-season games however an unfortunate foot injury prevented her from making her debut during the regular season. She was re-signed as an extended squad member of the 2020 Firebirds team, though was elevated to the senior team as a replacement for the pregnant vice-captain Gretel Bueta.

In August 2021, Dwan was named in the 2021/22 Australian Development squad, one level below the Australian Diamonds.

In September 2021, it was announced that Dwan and fellow player Rudi Ellis would both depart the Firebirds at the end of the month for other clubs. Later the same month, the Adelaide Thunderbirds announced they had signed Dwan for the 2022 Super Netball season.

References

External links
 Queensland Firebirds profile
 Suncorp Super Netball profile
 Netball Draft Central profile

Australian netball players
Queensland Firebirds players
Living people
1999 births
Australian Netball League players
Netball players from Queensland
Queensland Fusion players
Queensland state netball league players